Black Pearl (Polish: Czarna perła) is a 1934 Polish romantic crime drama directed by Michał Waszyński. Produced by Urania Film, it stars Reri and
Eugeniusz Bodo.

Plot
Stefan, a Polish sailor, gets into a bar fight on the exotic island of Tahiti. The injured Pole is attended to by Moana, a young Tahitian woman. The young people fall in love and swear fidelity to each other. They decide to go to Poland together. When the time comes to leave, Stefan, driven by greed, steals the "sacred pearls" from a local cave. On returning to Poland, he sets up his own successful business. For profit, he makes deals with criminals and starts an affair with Rene, the wife of one of the partners, causing a lot of suffering to his Moana. The Tahitian woman feels that she will lose her beloved because he does not behave like a white woman. However, when Stefan falls victim to a robbery attack, she comes to his aid, shielding him with her own body from the bandit's bullet.

Cast
Reri as Moana
Eugeniusz Bodo as Stefan Nadolski
Lena Żelichowska as  Rena Torn
Michał Znicz as Krzysztof
Antoni Różycki as Grzeszczyński, gang leader
Franciszek Brodniewicz as Torn
Henryk Rzętkowski as Antoni

References

External links
 

1934 films
1930s Polish-language films
Polish black-and-white films
Films directed by Michał Waszyński
1934 crime drama films
1934 romantic drama films
Films about interracial romance
Polish romantic drama films
Polish crime drama films
Romantic crime films